Homestead Base is a census-designated place (CDP) in Miami-Dade County, Florida, United States. The population was 999 at the 2020 census. The CDP comprises the extent of Homestead Air Reserve Base plus some surrounding land.

Geography
It is bordered to the southwest by the city of Homestead.

Demographics

2020 census

As of the 2020 United States census, there were 999 people, 143 households, and 143 families residing in the CDP.

2000 census
At the 2000 census there were 446 people, 13 households, and 11 families living in the CDP. There were 13 housing units at an average density of 3.0/sq mi (1.2/km). The racial makeup of the CDP was 48.88% White (15% were Non-Hispanic White,) 39.46% African American, 0.67% Native American, 0.90% Asian, 6.50% from other races, and 3.59% from two or more races. Hispanic or Latino of any race were 45.52%.

Of the 13 households 69.2% had children under the age of 18 living with them, 76.9% were married couples living together, 15.4% had a female householder with no husband present, and 7.7% were non-families. 7.7% of households were one person and none had someone living alone who was 65 or older.  The average household size was 4.85 and the average family size was 5.17.

The age distribution was 33.6% under the age of 18, 9.4% from 18 to 24, 34.5% from 25 to 44, 18.2% from 45 to 64, and 4.3% 65 or older.  The median age was 29 years. For every 100 females, there were 101.8 males.  For every 100 females age 18 and over, there were 109.9 males.

The median household income was $43,750 and the median family income  was $43,750. Males had a median income of $6,979 versus $20,662 for females. The per capita income for the CDP was $6,181.  None of the families and 65.5% of the population were living below the poverty line, including no under eighteens and none of those over 64.

References

Census-designated places in Miami-Dade County, Florida
Census-designated places in Florida